The Great Lost Bear is a bar and restaurant in Portland, Maine, United States. Established in 1979 by Dave and Weslie Evans and Chip MacConnell, it is noted for its selection of draft craft beers.

Its location was formerly occupied by a rock club named Bottoms Up. The new venture, originally named The Grizzly Bear, opened on June 18, 1979, and it received no customers.

In 1981, the name of the business was changed to The Great Lost Bear after a cease-and-desist letter was received from Grizzly Bear Pizza in Oregon. The "Grizzly" sign now hangs in the restaurant's dining room.

The Evanses purchased MacConnell's share of the business in 2011, becoming sole owners. The same year, the bar appeared in an episode of Drinking Made Easy.

Today, the bar has around seventy beer taps. In 2018 it was voted Best Beer Bar in Maine by CraftBeer.com.

Notable past patrons include Jerry Seinfeld.

References

External links 

 Official website

Companies based in Portland, Maine
American companies established in 1979
1979 establishments in Maine
Restaurants established in 1979
Restaurants in Portland, Maine